Tim Polasek (born August 8, 1979) is an American college football coach and former player, currently the offensive coordinator and quarterbacks coach at the University of Wyoming. He was previously the offensive coordinator at North Dakota State University in Fargo where he helped the Bison to two consecutive NCAA Division I Football Championships in addition to winning two more in other coaching positions.

Coaching career

Wisconsin-Stevens Point
Polasek began his career in coaching with Wisconsin-Stevens Point. He began in the spring of 2003 as the team's quarterbacks coach. For the fall he was given the role of pass game coordinator, wide receivers coach, and tight ends coach. In 2004 he added the role of special teams coordinator. In 2005 he was the team's defensive backs coach and the special teams coordinator.

North Dakota State (first stint)
In 2006 Polasek joined NDSU as a graduate assistant. In 2007 he was given the role of running backs coach which he held until the end of the team's 2011 championship season. For NDSU's 2012 championship season, Tim served as the special teams coordinator, tight ends coach, and fullbacks coach.

Northern Illinois 
In 2013 Polasek joined the Huskies as the team's tight ends coach and fullbacks coach. He helped the team to the 2013 Mid-American Conference championship game and Poinsettia Bowl.

North Dakota State (second stint)
In 2014 Polasek returned to Fargo, as the team's offensive coordinator and running backs coach. He stayed in that role until the end of the 2016 season after winning two additional championships with the Bison.

Iowa
It was announced in February of 2017 that Polasek would become the offensive line coach at the University of Iowa under Kirk Ferentz. He stayed there until after the 2020 season.

Wyoming
On February 10, 2021 the Wyoming Cowboys announced that Tim Polasek would reunite with Craig Bohl as the team's new offensive coordinator and quarterbacks coach.

References

1979 births
People from Iola, Wisconsin
American football quarterbacks
Living people
Concordia Bulldogs football players
North Dakota State Bison football coaches
Iowa Hawkeyes football coaches
Wyoming Cowboys football coaches